The Canton of Amiens-2 is a canton situated in the department of the Somme and in the Hauts-de-France region of northern France.

Composition
At the French canton reorganisation which came into effect in March 2015, the canton was expanded from 3 to 11 communes:
Allonville
Amiens (northeastern part) 
Bertangles
Cardonnette
Coisy
Montonvillers
Poulainville
Querrieu
Rainneville
Saint-Gratien
Villers-Bocage

See also
 Arrondissements of the Somme department
 Cantons of the Somme department
 Communes of the Somme department

References

Amiens 2
Canton 2